Dzikowo  is a village in the administrative district of Gmina Barlinek, within Myślibórz County, West Pomeranian Voivodeship, in north-western Poland.

Notable residents
 Karl Wilhelm Posselt (1815-1885), missionary

References

Villages in Myślibórz County